Anykščiai (see other names)  is a ski resort town in Lithuania,  west of Utena. Anykščiai has a resort status in Lithuania and is a popular destination of domestic tourism.

Name
Anykščiai is the Lithuanian name of the city. Its name in other languages includes ; ; ; ; .

History

Archeological research in the area has revealed settlements dating from the late Neolithic.
Anykščiai was first mentioned on November 7, 1442 as a possession of Grand Duke of Lithuania Kazimieras Jogailaitis.

Its location on the Šventoji River, connecting it to the Baltic Sea via the Neris River and Neman River, contributed to its development. It also lay on a land route between the cities of Vilnius and Riga. Its strategic importance led to frequent assaults by the Teutonic Order. The first written mention of the town dates to 1442; its first appearance on a map is dated tentatively to about 1578.

Anykščiai is a place where many Lithuanian poets and writers originated - Antanas Vienuolis, Antanas Baranauskas, Jonas Biliūnas. It is called Weimar of Lithuania for that reason. There are about 250 culturally and historically important places in Anykščiai and Anykščiai district - Anykščių šilelis, to which the poem The Forest of Anykščiai of A.Baranauskas was dedicated, Puntukas boulder, the Beacon of Happiness monument, canopy walkway, horse museum, manors and old Lithuanian fort hills shrouded in mystery and legends.

Prior to Lithuania re-establishing its independence after World War I, Anykščiai was part of the Kovno Governorate of the Russian Empire. A shtetl existed within the town, with a Jewish population of 2,754 in 1900.

Wool processing facilities, a winery, and Lithuanian and Jewish schools were established after World War I, when its population reached about 4,000. During World War II, its bridges and city center were destroyed. In summer 1941, two mass executions of the local Jewish population occurred. Around 1,500 Jews were murdered by German Nazis and their local collaborators.

After the Soviet occupation, Anykščiai became a center of Aukštaitija partisans. Anykščiai district was the only one in Lithuania which belonged to 5 partisan military districts (apygarda) - Algimantas, Didžiosios Kovos (The Great Fight), Vytis, Vytautas and to a third district of Northern Lithuania - Aukštaitija by the Lithuanian Freedom Army. In 2014 in Šimonių giria (The Šimoniai Forest) a cognitive route was created which leads through the places of the Algimantas military district partisan paths and places.

Industry

Famous in Lithuania fruit winery Anykščių vynas, established in 1926 by Balys Karazija.

Notable natives and residents 
 Józef Abelewicz, Polish theologian
 Antanas Baranauskas, poet, whose home is preserved in Anykščiai Regional Park.
 Jonas Biliūnas, writer
 Giedrius Titenis, swimmer
 Antanas Vienuolis, writer
 Bronė Buivydaitė, writer
 Greta Baldauskaitė, psychologist
 Valdas Papievis, writer
 Rimša Vytautas, researcher librarian, bibliographer, pedagogue
 Osvaldas Janonis, Vilnius University professor, doctor of humanities, bibliographer, pedagogue
 Šablevičius Bronius, Doctor of Science
 Sergejus Jovaiša, basketball player

Twin towns — sister cities

Anykščiai is twinned with:

 Dalaman, Turkey
 Gnosjö, Sweden
 Krupina, Slovakia
 Madona, Latvia
 Myrhorod, Ukraine
 Nepomuk, Czech Republic
 Ödeshög, Sweden
 Omiš, Croatia
 Os, Norway
 Stavanger, Norway
 Devecser, Hungary
 Sejny, Poland
 Telavi, Georgia
 Sevan, Armenia
 Vasylkiv, Ukraine

References 

 Anikisht in the Yizkor (Memorial) book of Lithuanian Jewry

External links
 Virtual Tour of Anykščiai

 
Cities in Lithuania
Cities in Utena County
Ski areas and resorts in Lithuania
Municipalities administrative centres of Lithuania
Vilkomirsky Uyezd
Shtetls
Holocaust locations in Lithuania
Anykščiai District Municipality
Jewish communities destroyed in the Holocaust